My Honky Tonk History is the American country music artist Travis Tritt's ninth studio album, released on Columbia Records in 2004. It features the singles "The Girl's Gone Wild", "What Say You" (feat. John Mellencamp), and "I See Me", which peaked at #28, #21 and #32 on the Hot Country Songs charts, respectively. The duet was Mellencamp's first Top 40 entry on the country charts.

The track "Circus Leaving Town" was previously recorded by its writer, Philip Claypool, on his 1995 debut album A Circus Leaving Town. Claypool's version of the song peaked at #70 on the country charts that year.

Track listing

Personnel 
As listed in liner notes.

 Mike Brignardello – bass guitar
 Pat Buchanan – electric guitar
 Tom Bukovac – electric guitar
 Lisa Cochran – background vocals
 Tammy Cochran – background vocals
 John Cowan – background vocals
 Melodie Crittenden – background vocals
 Eric Darken – percussion, cowbell, vibraphone
 Amber Dotson – background vocals
 Dan Dugmore – steel guitar, Dobro
 Béla Fleck – banjo on "What Say You"
 Larry Franklin – fiddle, mandolin
 Rob Hajacos – fiddle
 Wes Hightower – background vocals
 Jim Hoke – harmonica
 John Barlow Jarvis – piano, Hammond organ, synthesizer
 Eddie Kilgallon – background vocals
 Brent Mason – electric guitar
 John Mellencamp – duet vocals on "What Say You"
 Greg Morrow – drums, percussion, tambourine
 Richard Richardson – background vocals
 Hargus "Pig" Robbins – piano, Hammond organ, synthesizer
 John Wesley Ryles – background vocals
 Neil Thrasher – background vocals
 Travis Tritt – lead vocals, background vocals
 Robby Turner – steel guitar, Dobro
 Billy Joe Walker Jr. – acoustic guitar, electric guitar, gut string guitar
 Biff Watson – acoustic guitar
 Joy Lynn White – background vocals
 Hurshel Wiginton – background vocals
 Gretchen Wilson – background vocals
 Reggie Young – electric guitar, electric sitar
 Jonathan Yudkin – banjo

Strings on "I See Me" performed by the Nashville String Machine and arranged by D. Bergen White.

Chart performance

References 

2004 albums
Columbia Records albums
Travis Tritt albums
Albums produced by Billy Joe Walker Jr.